Eurovision: Your Country Needs Blue is a documentary that aired on BBC One on 16 April 2011. It was narrated by Graham Norton.

The documentary focused on Blue and how they managed to represent the UK in the 2011 Eurovision Song Contest. Archive clips from Eurovision were included and contributions came from (amongst others): Cliff Richard, Lulu, John Barrowman, Aston Merrygold, Marvin Humes, Arlene Phillips, Scott Mills, Robin Gibb, David Arnold and Bucks Fizz

References
 http://www.whatsontv.co.uk/todays-top-tv/eurovision-your-country-needs-blue/35271
 http://www.panarmenian.net/eng/culture/news/67414/Preparations_for_Eurovision_2011_continue_in_Dusseldorf

External links
 
 

BBC television documentaries
United Kingdom in the Eurovision Song Contest
Documentary television series about music
2011 in British television
British documentary television series
Your Country Needs Blue